Haplolabida viette  is a species of moth of the family Geometridae first described by Claude Herbulot in 1970. It is found in northern Madagascar.

This species looks similar to Haplolabida marojejensis, described by Herbulot in 1963 and Haplolabida lacrimans, described by Herbulot in 1970. The length of its forewings is 13.5 mm.

References

Larentiinae
Moths described in 1970
Moths of Madagascar
Moths of Africa